Steam stripping is a process used in petroleum refineries and petrochemical plants to remove volatile contaminants, such as hydrocarbons and other volatile organic compounds (VOCs), from wastewater. It typically consists of passing a stream of superheated steam through the wastewater. 

This method is effective when the volatile compounds have lower boiling points than water or have limited solubility in water.

References

Petroleum engineering
Petrochemical industry
Industrial emissions control